Class A basic helix-loop-helix protein 15 (bHLHa15) also known as class B basic helix-loop-helix protein 8 (bHLHb8) or muscle, intestine and stomach expression 1 (MIST-1) is a protein that in humans is encoded by the BHLHA15 gene.

Function 

bHLHa15 is required developmentally for the proper organization of all protein secreting, serous exocrine glands. In the absence of Mist1, exocrine tissue shows improper organization of organelles, especially the localization of the zymogen granules. The zymogen granules are the vesicles that store enzymes near the plasma membrane for easy release when stimulated. This disorganization caused by the loss of Mist1 leads to increased susceptibility toward pancreatic damage and potentially pancreatic cancer.

References

Further reading